Gibson Reservoir is a man-made body of water located just south of the Bob Marshall Wilderness,  northwest of Augusta, Montana. It forms part of the county line between Teton and Lewis & Clark counties. The reservoir is formed by the concrete arch Gibson Dam and backs water up between a hilly pass for about 3 miles.  The water in the dam is initially provided by spring snow runoff and carried there via the North Fork Sun River and the South Fork Sun River right after the two join.  The reservoir is mainly used for irrigation control.

References

External links
Gibson Reservoir Bathymetric Map Montana Fish, Wildlife & Parks 

Reservoirs in Montana
Buildings and structures in Teton County, Montana
Protected areas of Flathead County, Montana
Protected areas of Teton County, Montana
Lewis and Clark National Forest
Bodies of water of Teton County, Montana
Lakes of Flathead County, Montana